In Myanmar Armed Forces, there are two different ranks, one higher than another, but both designated as four-star ranks.
 Vice-senior General: a rank between five-star rank of Senior general and four-star rank of General/Admiral, but designated as a four-star rank.
 General or Admiral: the actual four-star rank.

Vice-senior general 
"Vice-senior general" is the second highest rank in Myanmar Armed Forces. It is held by the person appointed to both Deputy Commander-in-Chief of Defence Services and Commander-in-Chief (Army). Since 2012, it can also be held by the Commander-in-Chief of Defence Services if he has not yet been promoted to Senior general.

It is between the five-star rank of Senior general and the four-star rank of General or Admiral, thus being a unique rank existing only in Myanmar Armed Forces. The rank medals of both Vice-Senior general and General/Admiral have the same observe; both with golden logo of Armed Forces and four golden stars overheading it, but the rank medal of Senior general has a green stripe in addition to that of General/Admiral. Thus, it can be assumed as a higher variant of four-star rank. The flag of Deputy Commander-in-Chief of Defence Services also confirms that.

Insignia

History 
When the five-star rank Senior general was created above the four-star rank General, there was no Vice-senior general or similar rank between them. In 1990, General Saw Maung promoted himself directly to Senior general, his deputy: Lieutenant General Than Shwe to General, and Brigadier General Maung Aye to Major general. In 1993, General Than Shwe was promoted directly to Senior general, and Major General Maung Aye was promoted to Lieutenant general and became deputy of Than Shwe.

Lieutenant General Maung Aye was promoted to General in 1994, and then Vice-senior general in 2002. Thus, he became the first person to hold the rank of Vice-senior general.

List of rank holders

General/Admiral 
'General' or 'Admiral' is the third highest rank in Myanmar Armed Forces, and traditionally the highest rank that a personnel from Myanmar Navy and Myanmar Air Force can get. It is a four-star general rank.

The rank's Burmese title and insignia is the same for all branches. But Myanmar Navy uses different English translation, to be harmonized with the naval terms. "" is translated as "General" for army and air force, and as "Admiral" for navy.

Since 2011, the rank "" is designated to be held by the persons in following appointments. 

Beside these appointments, the Armed Forces personnels appointed as Union Ministers in the government can also hold this rank. Currently, the Union Ministers of the Ministry of Defence and the Ministry of Transport and Communications are General and Admiral respectively.

Insignia

References 

Four-star officers
Military ranks of Myanmar